Márcio André Meira Fernandes (born 9 January 1994) is a Portuguese footballer who plays for Enosis Neon Paralimniou as a midfielder.

Football career
He made his professional debut for Ermis Aradippou on 23 August 2020 in the Cypriot First Division.

References

External links

1994 births
Living people
Sportspeople from Guimarães
Portuguese footballers
Association football midfielders
Campeonato de Portugal (league) players
Cypriot First Division players
Lusitano F.C. (Portugal) players
Louletano D.C. players
C.F. Os Armacenenses players
Real S.C. players
Ermis Aradippou FC players